Band Jub, Bandjub, and Band-e Jub may refer to:

Band Jub 1
Band Jub 2